Stony Mountain Wildland Provincial Park is a wildland provincial park in Wood Buffalo, northern Alberta, Canada. The park is part of the Lower Athabasca Regional Plan.

Location

Ecology
The park is in the Lower Boreal Highlands subregion of the Boreal Forest natural region of Alberta. The park preserves examples of patterned and non-patterned fens. Six provincially rare plants have been identified in the vicinity of Maqua Lake, which is located just north of the park. The park is part of the range of the East Side Athabasca River Boreal woodland caribou herd.

Activities
The park has no developed facilities so only wildlife viewing, backcountry hiking, and random backcountry camping are available. Off-highway vehicles and snowmobiles are permitted on existing trails only. Aircraft access and landing in the park requires authorization. Hunting is allowed with proper permits.

See also
List of Alberta provincial parks
List of Canadian provincial parks

References

External links
 

Parks in Alberta
Regional Municipality of Wood Buffalo